|}

The Glenfarclas Cross Country Chase is a National Hunt steeplechase in Great Britain which is open to horses aged five years or older. It is run on the Cross-Country Course at Cheltenham over a distance of about 3 miles and 6 furlongs (3 miles 6 furlongs and 37 yards, or 6,069 metres), and during its running there are thirty-two obstacles to be cleared. It was originally run as a handicap race before being changed to a conditions race from the 2016 running, and it is scheduled to take place each year on the second day of the Cheltenham Festival in March.

The event was established when a fourth day was added to the Cheltenham Festival in 2005. It is now one of three cross-country chases held at Cheltenham – the others take place in November and December. All three were originally sponsored by Sporting Index, and in the 2007–08 season they were backed by BGC. The whisky distillery Glenfarclas began supporting the series in 2008–09.

Records
Most successful horse (3 wins):
 Tiger Roll - 2018, 2019, 2021

Leading jockey (4 wins):
 Nina Carberry – Heads Onthe Ground (2007), Garde Champetre (2008, 2009), Josies Orders (2016)
 Keith Donoghue -  Tiger Roll (2018,2019,2021), Delta Work (2023) 

Leading trainer (5 wins):
 Enda Bolger – Spot Thedifference (2005), Heads Onthe Ground (2007), Garde Champetre (2008, 2009), Josies Orders (2016)
 Gordon Elliott-  Cause of Causes (2017), Tiger Roll (2018, 2019), Delta Work (2022, 2023)

Winners
 Weights given in stones and pounds.

See also
 Horse racing in Great Britain
 List of British National Hunt races
 Recurring sporting events established in 2005  – included under its original title, Sporting Index Cross Country H'cap Chase.

References

 Racing Post:

 pedigreequery.com – Cross Country Chase – Cheltenham.
 racenewsonline.co.uk – Racenews Archive (21 February 2008).

National Hunt races in Great Britain
Cheltenham Racecourse
National Hunt chases
Recurring sporting events established in 2005
2005 establishments in England